The CRC Press, LLC is an American publishing group that specializes in producing technical books. Many of their books relate to engineering, science and mathematics. Their scope also includes books on business, forensics and information technology. CRC Press is now a division of Taylor & Francis, itself a subsidiary of Informa.

History 
The CRC Press was founded as the Chemical Rubber Company (CRC) in 1903 by brothers Arthur, Leo and Emanuel Friedman in Cleveland, Ohio, based on an earlier enterprise by Arthur, who had begun selling rubber laboratory aprons in 1900. The company gradually expanded to include sales of laboratory equipment to chemists.  In 1913 the CRC offered a short (116-page) manual called the Rubber Handbook as an incentive for any purchase of a dozen aprons.  Since then the Rubber Handbook has evolved into the CRC's flagship book, the CRC Handbook of Chemistry and Physics.

In 1964, Chemical Rubber decided to focus on its publishing ventures, and in 1973 the company changed its name to CRC Press, Inc, and exited the manufacturing business, spinning off that line as the Lab Apparatus Company. 

In 1986 CRC Press was bought by the Times Mirror Company. Times Mirror began exploring the possibility of a sale of CRC Press in 1996, and in December announced the sale of CRC to Information Ventures. In 2003, CRC became part of Taylor & Francis, which in 2004 became part of the UK publisher Informa.

See also 
Chapman & Hall
MathWorld

References

External links 
  of CRC Press

Publishing companies established in 1903
Book publishing companies of the United States
Publishing companies of the United States
Companies based in Boca Raton, Florida